Campos del Tuyú National Park is a national park in Buenos Aires Province, Argentina. Situated on the southern shore of Samborombón Bay, the park was established on May 13, 2009. The main attraction of Campos del Tuyú is the rare pampas deer; in fact, it is one of the few places in the Pampas where this species survive. Other inhabitants of the park include the Geoffroy's cat (Leopardus geoffroyi), capybara and over a hundred bird species.

References

National parks of Argentina
Protected areas established in 2009
2009 establishments in Argentina
Protected areas of Buenos Aires Province